"Feels So Good (Show Me Your Love)" is a hit song by one-hit wonder artist Lina Santiago. It hit #35 on the Billboard Hot 100 on April 6, 1996. It was recorded and released in 1995 before she was 17 years old. Due to a series of bad decisions on her record label's part when they suggested her first album consist almost entirely of ballads, the song was her only hit. She was eventually dropped by Universal in 1997, after releasing only three singles and one album in her discography, all of which were released before she turned 18 years old.

Charts

Weekly Charts

Citations

References
 

1995 singles
1996 singles
1995 songs
Universal Records singles